Henry Durand Tillman (born August 1, 1960) is an American former professional boxer.

Early life
Tillman was born in Los Angeles, California.

Amateur career
Tillman twice defeated Mike Tyson as an amateur, winning both bouts via close decisions. Tillman went on to win heavyweight gold at the Los Angeles Olympics against highly touted Canadian boxer Willie DeWitt, considered the world's #1 amateur heavyweight by the AIBA in 1984 (to whom he lost in 1988 in professionals.)

Highlights

United States National Championships (super heavyweight), Indianapolis, Indiana, December 1982:
 1/16: Defeated Howard Lake by split decision, 3–2
 1/8: Defeated William Ross RSC 2
 1/4: Lost to Mark Mahone by majority decision, 1–4
USA–USSR Duals (super heavyweight), Indiana Convention Center, Indianapolis, Indiana, March 1983:
 Lost to Alexander Yagubkin (Soviet Union) by decision
USA–Cuba Duals (heavyweight), Havana, Cuba, April 1983:
 Lost to Hermenegildo Báez (Cuba) by unanimous decision, 0–5
 National Sports Festival (heavyweight), Olympic Training Center, Colorado Springs, Colorado, June 1983:
1/2: Defeated Henry Milligan RSC 2
Finals (Pan Am Trials): Defeated Richard Johnson by majority decision, 4–1
Pan Am Box-Offs (178 lbs), St. Louis, Missouri, August 1983:
 Defeated (no data available) 
 Pan American Games (heavyweight), Caracas, Venezuela, August 1983:
 1/2: Defeated Virgilio Frias (Dominicana) by majority decision, 4–1
 Finals: Lost to Aurelio Toyo (Cuba) by majority decision, 1–4
USA–Bulgaria Duals (light heavyweight), Rapid City, South Dakota, October 1983:
 Lost to Deyan Kirilov (Bulgaria) by unanimous decision, 0–3

United States National Championships (heavyweight), Colorado Springs, Colorado, November 1983:
1/8: Lost to Henry Milligan by split decision, 2–3
USA–Combined Team of GBR & Canada Duals (heavyweight), Reno, Nevada, November 1983:
 Finals: Lost to Willie DeWitt (Canada) KO 1 
National Golden Gloves (heavyweight), St. Louis, Missouri, April 1984:
 1/4: Defeated Terry Anderson by decision
 1/2: Lost to Jonathan Littles by walkover
Olympic Trials (heavyweight), Tarrant County Convention Center, Fort Worth, Texas, June 1984:
 1/4: Defeated Olian Alexander by majority decision, 4–1
 1/2: Defeated James Pritchard by majority decision, 4–1
 Finals: Defeated Mike Tyson by unanimous decision, 5–0 
Olympic Box-Offs (heavyweight), Caesars Palace, Las Vegas, Nevada, July 1984:
 Defeated Mike Tyson by majority decision, 4–1
 Olympic Games (heavyweight), Los Angeles, California, August 1984:
 1/8: Defeated Kaliq Singh (India) RSCH 1
 1/4: Defeated Tevita Taufo'ou (Tonga) RSCH 2
 1/2: Defeated Angelo Musone (Italy) by unanimous decision, 5–0
 Finals: Defeated Willie DeWitt (Canada) by unanimous decision, 5–0

Professional career

Tillman turned pro in 1984 as a cruiserweight and had a disappointing professional career, primarily due to a weak chin. In 1986, he was knocked down twice and upset by Bert Cooper via a decision. In 1987 he secured a bout at WBA Cruiserweight Title holder Evander Holyfield. Holyfield dropped Tillman three times en route to a 7th-round TKO, according to WBA rules. Tillman later lost to Willie DeWitt in a rematch of their 1984 Heavyweight Olympic Final bout. In 1990, he took on Mike Tyson in Tyson's comeback bout after his loss to James "Buster" Douglas. Tyson knocked him out in the first round. He finished his professional career with a record of 25-6-0 with 16 knockouts.

In the movie Rocky V, Tillman played contender "Tim Simms" who lost a bout to "Tommy Gunn" played by Tommy Morrison.

Personal life
At the 1984 Summer Olympics Henry met his bride-to-be Gina Hemphill, a granddaughter of Jesse Owens, she carried the torch into the Los Angeles Coliseum at the opening ceremony, and worked as a production assistant on The Oprah Winfrey Show in Chicago. In 1987 they were married among friends and Olympic teammates.

Legal issues
In February 2001, Tillman was sentenced to six years in prison for a 1996, attempted murder and voluntary manslaughter charge, and released from custody in 2002. In July 2004, Tillman was sentenced to 37 months in prison after pleading guilty to federal identity theft charges.

Professional boxing record

References

External links
 

1960 births
Living people
Boxers from Los Angeles
African-American Muslims
Olympic boxers of the United States
American prisoners and detainees
Boxers at the 1983 Pan American Games
Pan American Games silver medalists for the United States
Boxers at the 1984 Summer Olympics
Olympic gold medalists for the United States in boxing
African-American boxers
American male boxers
Medalists at the 1984 Summer Olympics
Pan American Games medalists in boxing
American sportspeople convicted of crimes
American people convicted of attempted murder
American people convicted of manslaughter
American people convicted of theft
Heavyweight boxers
Medalists at the 1983 Pan American Games
21st-century African-American people
20th-century African-American sportspeople